Pseudorhabdosynochus querni is a species of diplectanid monogenean parasitic on the gills of the grouper Epinephelus quernus. It was described in 1968 by Satyu Yamaguti under the name Diplectanum querni  and transferred to the genus Pseudorhabdosynochus in 1986. The species has been redescribed in 2005 from the type-material.

Description 

Pseudorhabdosynochus querni is a small monogenean, 0.45-0.7 mm in length. The species has the general characteristics of other species of Pseudorhabdosynochus, with a flat body and a posterior haptor, which is the organ by which the monogenean attaches itself to the gill of is host. The haptor bears two squamodiscs, one ventral and one dorsal.
The sclerotized male copulatory organ, or "quadriloculate organ", has the shape of a bean with four internal chambers, as in other species of Pseudorhabdosynochus.
The vagina includes a sclerotized part, which is a complex structure.

Etymology
The specific epithet of the species, querni, is not clearly explained in the original publication, but obviously refers to the name of the host fish, Epinephelus quernus.

Hosts and localities

The type-locality is off Hawaii and the type-host is the Hawaiian grouper Epinephelus quernus (recently classified as Hyporthodus quernus).

References

External links 

Diplectanidae
Animals described in 1968
Fauna of Hawaii